Mohammad Bahiraei ( Persian: محمد بحیرایی born April 3, 1990) is an Iranian professional water polo player who is currently playing for Iran men's national water polo team. from 2007 to 2016 he was the national water polo player of Iran.

Biography 
Mohammad Bahiraei was born in Tehran in April 1990. At the age of four, he started swimming at amjadiyeh Stadium in Tehran, under the supervision of Professor Cyrus Taherian, and at the age of 13, under the supervision of the same professor at Waterpolo, he became a member of the National Water Polo team at the age of 17 years. In 2008, he won the gold medal at the Asian Championship, he was a member of the national team until 2016 and is currently pursuing his sporting activities in the clubs and the Water Polo League. He graduated from the University of Tehran with a degree in physical education and sports science.

National honors 
Gold medal, 1st place in Asia, Indonesia 2007 

National Water Polo Team of Iran

Club Honors 
Iran Water Polo League

  Silver medal, national championship title - First Division national league, Tehran team 2007
  Gold Medal, Championship - Water Polo Premier League Clubs, Iran Development Team 2008
  Bronze Medal, Third Place - National Cup Club Cup, Iran Development Team 2009
  Gold Medal, Championship Championship - Water Polo Premier League Clubs, Islamic Azad University, 2009
  Gold Medal, Championship Championship - League Matches, Abadan Oil Industry Team, 2010
  Gold Medal, Championship Championship - League Championship Division, Pasargad Bank Team, 2011
  Bronze Medal, Third Place - Water Polo Premier League Clubs, Islamic Azad University, 2013
  Silver Medal, National Championship - League Championship Division, Tehran Oil Team, 2017
  Gold Medal, Championship Championship - Division One League, Milan, 2018

Super League of the Premier League 
Vice President, Iran Club Development of Karaj

Degrees 
Second degree coaching degree

Second Degree Water Polo Coaching Degree

Water Polo Referee

International Salvage Certificate (ILS)

Education 
Expert in Physical Education and Sport Sciences from Tehran University

References

External links 
پیروزی تیم جوانان واترپلوی ایران در مسابقات آسیایی
جوانان واترپلو برای دومین بار قهرمان آسیا شدند
۳۵ خبرگزاری ورزش ۳
فدراسیون شنا، شیرجه و واترپلو جمهوری اسلامی ایران
تمرینات تیم ملی واترپلو با حضور لوتوس مولر آغاز شد
فدراسیون شنا، شیرجه و واترپلو جمهوری اسلامی ایران
خبرگزاری مهرنیوز mehrnews
خبرگزاری دانشجویان ایران ایسنا
پایگاه خبری و اطلاع‌رسانی کمیته ملی المپیک
خبرگزاری تسنیم
روزنامه صبح ایران
خبرگزاری جمهوری اسلامی ایران، ایرنا IRNA
پایگاه خبری وزارت ورزش و جوانان
ملی پوشان واترپلو معرفی شدند
از سوی کادر فنی تیم ملی واترپلو؛ : ۲۸ بازیکن به اردوی تیم ملی واترپلو دعوت شدند
روزنامه ورزشی نود
۲۲ بازیکن به اردوی تیم ملی واترپلو دعوت شدند
خبرگزاری ایمنا
پایگاه تحلیلی خبری خرداد
خبرگزاری کار ایران ILNA
۴۲ خبرگزاری دانشجوSNN
مصاحبه خبرنگار ورزشی خبرگزاری شبستان با «محمد بحیرایی»، بازیکن اسبق تیم ملی واترپلوی کشور
محمد بحیرایی دروازه‌بان تیم واترپلو نیروی زمینی  در گفتگو با خبرنگار پایه و آبی باشگاه خبرنگاران جوان

Iranian male water polo players
1990 births
Living people
21st-century Iranian people